Saydet al-Najat Church explosion (or Our Lady of Deliverance Church explosion) happened on February 27, 1994, when a bomb exploded in a Maronite Catholic church in the Zouk Mikael town of Lebanon during a Sunday service, which resulted in the killing of 11 people and injuring 54, and the jailing of the Christian Lebanese Forces leader Samir Geagea, who in turn accused the Syrian-Lebanese security apparatus of the incident, which happened during the Syrian occupation of Lebanon at the time.

Background 
On February 27, 1994, at 9:15 am, a bomb exploded under the church altar while worshippers were receiving communion by Father Antoine Sfeir. Five other explosives were found in the church where more than 200 people were present. C4 explosives and two 81 mm mortar rounds exploded. 10 people were killed and 54 were injured. Subsequently one of those wounded died, bring the total number killed to eleven.

On 19 March the offices of the Lebanese Forces (LF) were raided and six people arrested, including Fouad Malik, LF secretary general, and three members of the LF intelligence apparatus including a woman. Also detained were a man and a woman from the Guardians of the Cedars.
Subsequently 150 LF members were detained and the LF banned on 23 March. On 21 April Samir Geagea was arrested. By that time eleven LF members remained in custody. The investigation into the church bombing had been extended to examine the murder of Dany Chamoun and his family. Geagea and four others were formally indicted for the Church bombing on 13 June. Commentators reported that the case against Geagea was not strong being based on hearsay and circumstantial evidence. The case also depended on a single witness, Girgis Khuri, and was weakened by the absence of two key players: Tony Obeid, LF head of operations, and Ghassan Touma, LF security chief, being in hiding abroad. Touma was believed to be in the United States. Three days later Geagea and twelve others were indicted for the murder of Dany Chamoun, his wife and two children. The trial opened on 19 November with Geagea employing more than a hundred lawyers, only five of whom were allowed into the court at one time. The following year, 24 June 1995, Geagea was found guilty of the murder of Chamoun and his family and sentenced to death, commuted to life in prison with hard labour. Two other accused who were in court were sentenced to shorter terms and ten LF members were sentenced to life in absentia. The case had been based entirely on circumstantial evidence and was condemned by Amnesty International as being seriously flawed. The trial over the church bombing was postponed in disarray after Girgis Khuri, the prosecutions main witness, withdrew his testomy.
Geagea, who was convicted of the bombing, spent 11 years in a solitary confinement, accused the Syrian-Lebanese security system of making the incident for the goal of dissolving the Lebanese Forces and arresting him.

On July 13, 1996, Public Prosecutor Adnan Addoum requested death penalty for Samir Geagea and others including Antonios Elias, Jerjes Khoury, Rushdi Raad and Jean Shahine, and hard labor for life for Fouad Malek and Paul and Rafik Al-Fahl.

Geagea he was released in 2005, and was found innocent of the bombing.

References 

Terrorist incidents in Lebanon
Lebanese Civil War
Maronite Church in Lebanon
Church bombings
1994 in Lebanon
February 1994 events in Asia
Terrorist incidents in Lebanon in 1994
Explosions in Lebanon
1994 disasters in Lebanon